Babaninka is a rural locality (a selo) in Starooskolsky District, Belgorod Oblast, Russia. The population was 118 as of 2010. There are 2 streets.

Geography 
Babaninka is located 23 km southeast of Stary Oskol (the district's administrative centre) by road. Gotovye is the nearest rural locality.

References 

Rural localities in Starooskolsky District